Maureen Ayité is a business model. She has created a female wax brand.

Life
She attended Jean-Mermoz International School in Abidjan.
She also studied in France.
She created a fashion Facebook group.
In 2013, she started her brand Nana wax.

References

External links

http://irawotalents.com/maureen-ayite-nanawax-pagne-afrique/*http://www.africatopsuccess.com/en/2015/03/09/womens-day-wink-at-maureen-ayite-promoter-of-nana-wax/
http://www.amina-mag.com/6-raisons-de-craquer-pour-nana-wax/*http://afrique.lepoint.fr/videos/nana-wax-pret-a-porter-du-pagne-30-11-2015-1985956_2367.php
http://www.lemonde.fr/afrique/article/2015/03/04/nana-wax-de-facebook-a-une-boutique_4587300_3212.html

Beninese businesspeople
Living people
Year of birth missing (living people)
Place of birth missing (living people)